Wang An (born 9 August 1958) is a Chinese engineer and business executive who was general manager and chairman of China International Engineering Consulting Corporation, and general manager of China National Coal Group. He was an academician of the Chinese Academy of Engineering.

Biography 
Wang was born in Liangcheng County, Inner Mongolia, on 9 August 1958. He graduated from Shanxi Mining Institute (now Taiyuan University of Technology) in 1982, and earned a master's degree from Liaoning Technical University in 2002.

He entered the workforce in August 1982, and joined the Communist Party of China (CPC) in June 1988. Beginning in 1982, he served in several posts in Wuda District Mining Bureau, including administrator, deputy team leader, team leader, engineer, and chief engineer. He was despatched to Shenhua Group in August 1998. He moved up the ranks to become deputy general manager in July 2008. In September 2008, he became general manager of China National Coal Group, the second largest state-owned coal mining enterprise in China, rising to chairman in August 2014. In September 2015, he appointed he general manager of China International Engineering Consulting Corporation. After this office was terminated in July 2020, he rose to become chairman, serving until October 2021.

Downfall
On 29 October 2021, he has been placed under investigation for "serious violations of discipline and laws" by the Central Commission for Discipline Inspection (CCDI), the party's internal disciplinary body, and the National Supervisory Commission, the highest anti-corruption agency of China. Before he stepped down, three academicians of the Chinese Academy of Engineering had been sacked for graft, namely , Zhou Guotai and Meng Wei.

Honours and awards 
 2009 Member of the Chinese Academy of Engineering (CAE)

References 

1958 births
Living people
People from Liangcheng County
Engineers from Inner Mongolia
Businesspeople from Inner Mongolia
Taiyuan University of Technology alumni
Liaoning Technical University alumni
Members of the Chinese Academy of Engineering